Gordan Petrić (born 30 July 1969) is a Serbian football manager and former player.

Club career
Petrić made his senior debut with OFK Beograd in the 1985–86 season, as the club suffered relegation from the top flight of Yugoslav football. He was transferred to Partizan in the 1989 winter transfer widow. In the following five years, Petrić won one league title and two national cups, before transferring to Scottish club Dundee United in November 1993. He immediately became a first-team regular under manager Ivan Golac, winning the Scottish Cup in his debut season with the club. His consistent performances at Tannadice earned him a move to Rangers in July 1995. Petrić remained with the club for three years, helping them secure their ninth league title in a row, before a spell in England with Crystal Palace. He scored once for the club in a 1–1 draw against Sheffield United.

In the summer of 1999, Petrić moved to Greece and joined AEK Athens. He left the club after only a few months and returned to Scotland when Jim Jefferies signed him for Hearts in December 1999. Petrić remained with Hearts until March 2001, leaving the club two years before the end of his contract by mutual consent. He scored once for Hearts in a 3–2 UEFA Cup win over VfB Stuttgart.

After six months of training with his former club Partizan, Petrić was loaned to Chinese club Sichuan Dahe in March 2002. He briefly stayed there, before retiring from the game.

International career
Petrić represented the Yugoslavia U20 national team at the 1987 FIFA World Youth Championship, as the team won the tournament. He was later called up to the Yugoslavia senior national team's UEFA Euro 1992 squad. However, the country was eventually banned from the tournament due to the Yugoslav Wars.

Petrić collected a total of five caps for the senior national team of his country between 1989 and 1997.

Post-playing career
Between 2007 and 2008, Petrić served as general secretary of Partizan. He was subsequently named vice-president of the club in October 2008, alongside Zoran Mirković. They both left their positions by September 2009.

In December 2012, Petrić was appointed manager of Bežanija. He left the club in late 2013. Subsequently, together with Ivan Tomić, Petrić was named as assistant to Serbia caretaker Ljubinko Drulović in May 2014.

After two brief stints at Sinđelić Beograd and Zemun, both in 2015, Petrić became manager of Serbian SuperLiga club Čukarički in September 2016. His contract was terminated by mutual consent after three months.

In June 2017, Petrić was appointed manager of Rad.

In September 2020, Petrić was named the new head coach of Slovenian top division side Gorica, replacing Borivoje Lučić. He resigned only three months later, when Gorica was in last place after 17 rounds.

On 12 August 2022, Petrić returned to Partizan, being appointed as the new manager of the club. On 24 February 2023, Petrić resigned.

Career statistics

Club

International

Honours
Partizan
 First League of FR Yugoslavia: 1992–93
 Yugoslav Cup: 1988–89, 1991–92

Dundee United
 Scottish Cup: 1993–94

Rangers
 Scottish Premier Division: 1995–96, 1996–97
 Scottish Cup: 1995–96
 Scottish League Cup: 1996–97

Yugoslavia
 FIFA World Youth Championship: 1987
 UEFA Under-21 Championship: runner-up 1990

References

External links
 AEK profile
 Hearts profile 
 Rangers stats
 Partizanopedia
 The Arab Archive
 
 
 
 
 

1969 births
Living people
Footballers from Belgrade
Yugoslav footballers
Serbian footballers
Serbian football managers
Association football defenders
Serbian SuperLiga managers
AEK Athens F.C. players
Chinese Super League players
Crystal Palace F.C. players
Dundee United F.C. players
Expatriate football managers in Greece
Expatriate footballers in China
Expatriate footballers in England
Expatriate footballers in Greece
Expatriate footballers in Scotland
First League of Serbia and Montenegro players
FK Čukarički managers
FK Partizan non-playing staff
FK Partizan players
FK Rad managers
FK Zemun managers
Heart of Midlothian F.C. players
OFK Beograd players
Rangers F.C. players
Scottish Football League players
Scottish Premier League players
Serbia and Montenegro expatriate footballers
Serbia and Montenegro expatriate sportspeople in China
Serbia and Montenegro expatriate sportspeople in Greece
Serbia and Montenegro expatriate sportspeople in Scotland
Serbia and Montenegro footballers
Serbia and Montenegro international footballers
Serbian expatriate football managers
Serbian expatriate sportspeople in Greece
Serbian expatriate sportspeople in Slovenia
Expatriate football managers in Slovenia
ND Gorica managers
Super League Greece players
Yugoslav First League players
Yugoslavia under-21 international footballers
Yugoslavia international footballers
Serbia and Montenegro expatriate sportspeople in England